William Hampton may refer to:

 William Hampton (mayor) (died 1480), Lord Mayor of London 1472/3
 William Hampton (cricketer) (1903–1964), English cricketer
 William Hampton (gridiron football) (born 1975), American gridiron football player
 William Hampton (poet) (born 1959), British poet
 William H. Hampton (1893–1957), New York state senator
 William Wade Hampton (1854–1928), one of the first attorneys in Gainesville, Florida
 William M. Hampton (died 1960), American physician and politician from North Carolina